Last Stop is a 1935 German romantic comedy film directed by E. W. Emo and starring Paul Hörbiger, Hans Moser, and Josefine Dora. It was filmed and set in Vienna.

The film's sets were designed by the art directors Kurt Dürnhöfer and Willi Herrmann.

Plot 
The film is about the tram driver Karl Vierthaler, who falls in love with the hat seamstress Anna. However, his parents have already planned the confectioner's daughter Rosa Schilling as a future wife for their son, which is why Karl should give up his job as a tram driver. With a good deal of stubbornness, Karl finally manages to get his way and win over Anna.

Cast

References

Bibliography

External links 
 

1935 films
Films of Nazi Germany
German romantic comedy films
1935 romantic comedy films
1930s German-language films
Films directed by E. W. Emo
Films set in Vienna
Films shot in Vienna
German black-and-white films
1930s German films